Elvis Corić (born 7 July 1981) is a retired Bosnian football striker.

References

1981 births
Living people
Bosnia and Herzegovina footballers
NK Brotnjo players
FK Velež Mostar players
HNK Cibalia players
HŠK Posušje players
NK Zvijezda Gradačac players
KF Flamurtari players
Persik Kediri players
Association football forwards
Bosnia and Herzegovina expatriate footballers
Expatriate footballers in Croatia
Bosnia and Herzegovina expatriate sportspeople in Croatia
Expatriate footballers in Albania
Bosnia and Herzegovina expatriate sportspeople in Albania
Expatriate footballers in Indonesia
Bosnia and Herzegovina expatriate sportspeople in Indonesia